Jim Steeg (born November 29, 1950, in Boston, Massachusetts) is an American sports executive. He is considered throughout the National Football League (NFL) as the individual most responsible for growing the Super Bowl into the most popular one-day sporting event in the world.

Steeg is currently a sports business, stadium and events consultant, advising companies on a variety of subjects. Included among the entities with whom he has consulted are the National Hockey League (NHL), the Pac-12 Conference, USC, UCLA, the Seidler/O'Malley Family in the purchase of the San Diego Padres and the Rose Bowl. He was the Director of the inaugural Pac-12 Football Championship Game, and he was the Chairman of the Advisory Board for the United States Football League (USFL). He organized the first of Shaun White's Air+Style at the Rose Bowl in 2014. He was appointed by Mayor Kevin Faulconer to San Diego's Citizens Stadium Advisory Group (CSAG) in 2015 that identified a site and financing plan for a new football stadium in 110 days. He is on the advisory board of Pacific Pro Football, a developmental football league that has not yet launched.

Steeg also has guest lectured and taught at several universities, including the University of North Carolina at Chapel Hill; North Carolina State; Wake Forest; San Diego State; Stanford and the University of California at Berkeley.  In 2017–2019, he taught a course called "Contemporary Issues in American Sports" at the Osher Lifelong Learning Institute (OLLI) at Duke University. Additionally, he is a regular expert in sports business on national and local sports radio and TV shows, and he also has hosted sports radio talk shows.

In 2002, Steeg was honored as a member of the inaugural class of the Special Events Hall of Fame. In 2005, he was recognized as the Hoosier Celebrity of the Year by the Mad Anthony's, a charitable organization in Fort Wayne, Ind., where he spent his teenage years. In 2008, he received the Pete Rozelle Award from the New Orleans Touchdown Club. He was selected to the DeMolay Hall of Fame in 2015 and the Phi Delta Theta Sports Hall of Fame the same year. Sports Business Journal recognized Steeg as part of its prestigious 2020 Class of The Champions: Pioneers and Innovators in Sports Business.

Steeg received a Masters of Business Administration from Wake Forest University in 1975 and a Bachelor's of Science degree in Political Science from Miami University in Oxford, Ohio in 1972. He lives in Chapel Hill, NC, with his wife Jill Lieber, a writer. He has two children.

Steeg has served on the boards of the Downtown YMCA of San Diego, the Make A Wish Foundation of San Diego, and the University of San Diego Athletic Department Executive Cabinet. He was co-chair of the Special Events Committee for the 2008 United States Open golf tournament at Torrey Pines in LaJolla, Calif. He has served on the boards of the San Diego Regional Chamber of Commerce, the United Way of San Diego, Hunger Related Events, and the Babcock School at Wake Forest. He was instrumental in raising funds for the Ramsey (N.J.) High School Athletic Department. He currently is Chairman of The AthLife Foundation and on the Executive Committee of the Tar Heel Soccer Club.

Super Bowl
In his 35 years with the National Football League (NFL), including 26 years in charge of the Special Events Department (1979–2004), Steeg grew the Super Bowl from a championship football game into a week-long extravaganza, with events like "The NFL Experience." He was responsible for all aspects of the Super Bowl, including site selection, stadium and practice site preparation and buildout; pre-game and halftime shows; national anthem performers; team, media, corporate and fan accommodations; corporate hospitality; television broadcasting; transportation; security; logo design, decorations and signage; ticket design, allocation and distribution; the NFL Commissioner's Party, and the oversight of the local community's Super Bowl Host Committee, as well as political relationships. Steeg oversaw and directed as many as 10,000 employees on site.

He also managed Super Bowl charitable events that raised more than US$50 million for host communities and children. He also implemented the NFL's Super Bowl Minority and Women-Owned Emerging Business Program in the early 1990s. The program mandated that the NFL and its various vendors and corporate clients hire local minority- and women-owned businesses whenever possible. It has now been copied with all other sports leagues and many national events.

During his tenure, Steeg implemented many of the signature Super Bowl game-day-related elements that eventually became staples throughout professional and Olympic sports. This included the use of Jumbotron video screens; enhanced-audio TV broadcasts throughout the entire stadium; TV access at concession stands; entertainment plazas both inside and outside the venue; a corporate hospitality village, and environmental recycling. In addition, he launched and oversaw all of the League-sponsored Super Bowl charitable events off the field, including the NFL Youth Football Clinic, the NFL Cheerleading Spirit Clinic, the Super Bowl College Lecture Series, "The Taste of the NFL," "Gridiron Glamour," and the NFL Charities Golf Classic. He also was instrumental in developing and directing the NFL's Youth Education Town (YET) Centers, learning centers for at-risk children in each of the Super Bowl host sites from 1993 to 2005.

Beyond his duties with the Super Bowl, Steeg had oversight of the NFL post-season schedule, the Pro Bowl in Honolulu, the American Bowl Games in Berlin and Barcelona, the NFL/Sr. PGA-Champions Tour Golf Tournament and all of the NFL's made-for-TV-events. Steeg developed the NFL Draft into a major annual event.

San Diego Chargers
From November 2004 until April 2010, Steeg was the Executive Vice President and Chief Operating Officer of the NFL's San Diego Chargers, where he was in charge of all business operations for the team. In his time with the team, Steeg worked to enhance the fan's game-day experience at Qualcomm Stadium, and in 2007, the Chargers were named the "Most Fan Friendly NFL franchise" by FansVoice.com. He spearheaded the team's transition in hosting training camp at Chargers Park. He headed the team's outreach into the Hispanic, military and neighboring communities in Orange and Riverside counties  and Mexico, as well as improved Chargers' alumni relations. He worked to bolster the team's community outreach programs. On the business side, he developed new and stronger relationships with the team's TV and radio partners; initiated a drive to redesign and add content to the team's website; led the team into record participation in social media platforms, launched the total redesign of the team's uniform and logo designs, and oversaw the team's 50th Anniversary celebration.

During his tenure, the team's revenue streams grew through sponsorships, stadium concessions, merchandise and parking, as well as record sales of tickets, club seats and suites. Concession and merchandise per capitas were among the highest in the NFL. The Chargers sold out 48 straight games under his guidance. Per his direction, the Chargers were at the forefront of professional sports in devising an alcohol game-day prevention program, called "Game Day The Right Way," along with being the first NFL team to utilize cutting-edge technology, including developing fan text messaging, JTech stadium response and the Venue Soft incident tracking program at games, as well as broadcasting a game in 3D. Under his watch, the Chargers were the first NFL team to experiment with Kangaroo TV (FanVision) and WiseDV. On March 31, 2010, Steeg left the Chargers to pursue opportunities that would allow him to take advantage of his professional and interpersonal skills while developing the innovative ideas he successfully has in his career.

Miami Dolphins
Prior to joining the NFL's League Offices in January 1979, Steeg was the business manager and controller for the Miami Dolphins. In his four years with the Dolphins, he was in charge of all of the financial and business aspects concerning the club. He additionally oversaw the operations of the NASL's Miami Toros/Fort Lauderdale Strikers.

References

Living people
1950 births
American chief operating officers
Wake Forest University alumni
Miami University alumni